Kantarama Gahigiri (born December 13, 1976) is a Swiss and Rwandan filmmaker. She is best known for her films Tapis rouge, Me + U, Lost Angel Less and more.

Career
Gahigiri's first feature film Tapis Rouge has been awarded Best Feature Film at Geneva International Film Festival and Best Directing at Chelsea Film Festival. She is now developing Tanzanite, an afro pulp dystopian thriller through Realness - An African Screenwriter's Residency.

Filmography

As Actress 

 The Mercy of the Jungle (2018)
 2B (2009)

Awards
Chelsea Film Festival -  Best Directing Award 2015

References

External links 
 
 

Living people
Rwandan film directors
Swiss women film directors
Year of birth missing (living people)
Rwandan women film directors